Calliostoma crossleyae is a species of sea snail, a marine gastropod mollusk in the family Calliostomatidae.

Description
The height of the shell attains 9 mm.

Distribution
This marine species occurs off Transkei, South KwaZuluNatal, South Africa

References

 Kilburn, R. N. 1972. Taxonomic notes on South African marine Mollusca (2), with the description of new species and subspecies of Conus, Nassarius, Vexillum and Demoulia. Annals of the Natal Museum 21(2):391–437, 1
 Steyn, D.G. & Lussi, M. (1998) Marine Shells of South Africa. An Illustrated Collector’s Guide to Beached Shells. Ekogilde Publishers, Hartebeespoort, South Africa, ii + 264 pp. page(s): 22

External links

crossleyae
Gastropods described in 1910